The Best of Elmo is a 1994 Sesame Street video originally released on VHS as part of the "My Sesame Street Home Video" series, the 16th and final title of the My Sesame Street Home Video series.

A follow-up, The Best of Elmo 2, was released in 2010, followed by The Best of Elmo 3 (2015), followed by The Best of Elmo 4 (2018).

Plot

As Maria leaves the Fix-It Shop carrying a large board of wood, Elmo walks by and accidentally bumps into her, dropping a bunch of pictures from his hands. After Maria helps pick them up, Elmo reveals that he is bringing them to the Monster-Art-Show and wants his friends to help decide what picture is best; Maria notices one drawing with Ernie and Elmo.

Maria tells Elmo that she likes the previous drawing the most, which Elmo – to her surprise – says that she can keep (as there are plenty more pictures to choose for the show). Maria spots another picture and asks where he got all his ideas; Elmo says that it is because of using his imagination, and Maria notices one drawing with Elmo in his imagination.

Meanwhile, at Finders Keepers, Ruthie startles Elmo as she handles a Chandelle boa. After Elmo regains posture, Ruthie looks at his pictures and learns that he intends to display them at the Monster-Art-Show, which was where she had bought ten pictures. She notices two of his pictures, one of Elmo trying to scare Julia Roberts and one of Elmo sitting on a ledge while wearing tap shoes.

Elmo assures Ruthie that there are many drawings left for the show, as the two look at a couple of more pictures. She finds one with the number 3 (from Elmo's number collection) and one with two backup singers. Elmo explains that the latter is about number 5, despite having no numbers on the picture.

Now at the Park, Elmo has laid his drawings on the ledge, commenting about how he is already just given out a few of them. Zoe suddenly appears, sees Elmo's pictures, and asks if she can keep some of them, especially one with Telly and Elmo and one with Whoopi Goldberg and Elmo.

Grasping the previous two pictures, Zoe notices two more – one with a face and one with trees. Meanwhile, Elmo starts to feel annoyed as the number of pictures gets smaller, saying, "It's not easy being the best."

Zoe thanks Elmo and departs, taking the pictures that she likes. Elmo decides to pick the best drawing for the Art Show but finds that he has only one picture remaining. Elmo shows his last picture to the viewer – a drawing of Elmo playing the piano.

Elmo decides that it is time to pick the best drawing for the Monster-Art-Show, but finds that he just has the last picture remaining in his hand. He decides to hang it up at the show, but a blue Honker comes by, feeling upset and explaining that he has never gotten one of Elmo's pictures and feels left out. This leaves Elmo with a conundrum, asking the viewer what they would do. He realizes that friends' feelings are more important than a contest, and generously gives his last drawing to the Honker. However, now Elmo feels sad that there are no pictures left to enter before walking off.

Then Elmo finds everyone gathered in front of 123 Sesame Street looking at his pictures and explains his problem. They all decide to give their pictures back, with Maria telling Elmo that he can return the pictures to them after the show. Elmo gleefully thanks them for their good deed, but now faces another problem: what picture should he pick for the show? Everyone laughs as Elmo asks the viewer what they liked best.

As the credits roll, more pictures are shown on different frames against a pink background, including one drawing of Ernie and Elmo, one drawing of Elmo using his imagination, one of Elmo sitting on the ledge wearing tap shoes, one of Elmo and Julia Roberts, one of two backup singers, one with the number 3, one of Elmo and Whoopi Goldberg, one with Telly and Elmo, one with trees, and the last one of Elmo playing the piano. After the credits and the slideshow, the drawing of Elmo playing the piano magically changes to him laughing to the viewer while at the piano.

Cast
 Ruth Buzzi as Ruthie
 Sonia Manzano as Maria

Jim Henson's Sesame Street Muppets
 Caroll Spinney as Big Bird
 Martin P. Robinson as Telly Monster/Mr. Snuffleupagus/Announcer
 Bryant Young as Mr. Snuffleupagus (Back Half)
 Fran Brill as Prairie Dawn/Zoe
 Jerry Nelson as Herry Monster
 Kevin Clash as Elmo/Wolfgang the Seal
 Jim Henson as Ernie

Additional Muppets performed by Joey Mazzarino, Carmen Osbahr, Pam Arciero, Jim Martin, Noel MacNeal, Peter Linz, Rick Lyon, David Rudman and Tyler Bunch.

Songs
 "One Fine Face"
 "In Your Imagination"
 "Happy Tappin' with Elmo"
 "Elmo's Jive Five" (ending cut out)
 "Three"
 "Heavy and Light"
 "The Sound That's in the Air"
 "Elmo's Song" (ending cut out)

External links

1994 television specials
Sesame Street features
1990s American television specials
1990s English-language films